The Warneford Hospital is a hospital providing mental health services at Headington in east Oxford, England. It is managed by the Oxford Health NHS Foundation Trust.

History
The hospital opened as the Oxford Lunatic Asylum in July 1826. It was designed by Richard Ingleman (1777–1838) and built of Headington stone. The name commemorates the philanthropist Samuel Wilson Warneford. It was renamed the Warneford Hospital in 1843 and extended by J.C. Buckler in 1852 and by William Wilkinson in 1877.

The hospital originally charged fees for treatment of middle class patients with a fund eventually being set up for the care of poor patients. Men and women were originally segregated on different sides of the hospital with this practice continuing into the 1950s.

Warneford Hospital was extensively mentioned in the book Dark Clouds Gather written by Katy Sara Culling about mental illness and published in 2011.

See also
 List of hospitals in England
 Warneford Meadow

References

Psychiatric hospitals in England
Hospitals established in 1826
1826 establishments in England
NHS hospitals in England
Hospitals in Oxford
Teaching hospitals in England